Aaron Crawford "Bud" Ross (November 8, 1868 – March 19, 1932) was an American actor, comedian, and screenwriter.

Career
Ross began his career in the 1880s, performing in musical comedies and vaudeville. He made his screen debut in the silent film The Burglar's Dilemma (1912) and had supporting roles in W. C. Fields's first two films, Pool Sharks and His Lordship's Dilemma (both 1915). He also supported Cissy Fitzgerald and starred in many comedies himself. At Vim Comedy Company and King-Bee Films starting in 1917, Ross supported a young Oliver Hardy and Chaplin impersonator Billy West in several comedies. Ross and Hardy co-wrote and appeared in the film Tootsies and Tamales (1919). He co-wrote many Peggy comedies in 1925. By the late 1920s, he was mostly playing supporting roles for Sennett, in Raymond McKee's Smith Family comedies and others.

Filmography
The Burglar’s Dilemma (1912)
A Sprig of Shamrock (1913)
Ethel's Romeos (1915)
His Lordship’s Dilemma (1915)
Alias Mr. Jones (1916)
The Slave (1917 comedy film)
The Candy Kid (1917)
Wanted - A Bad Man (1917)
The Fly Cop (1917)
The Villain
The Pest
Bright and Early (1918)
Tootsies and Tamales (1919)
Hypnotized (1932 film)

References

External links
 

1868 births
1932 deaths
19th-century American male actors
20th-century American male actors
20th-century American comedians
20th-century American screenwriters
American male comedy actors
American male film actors
American male silent film actors
American male stage actors
American male musical theatre actors
American male comedians
American male screenwriters
American comedy writers
Vaudeville performers
Male actors from Illinois
Comedians from Illinois
Screenwriters from Illinois
People from Springfield, Illinois
Writers from Springfield, Illinois
20th-century American male writers
19th-century American comedians